Poeltidea is a genus of lichenized fungi within the family Lecideaceae. It contains two species: Poeltidea perusta and Poeltidea inspersa.

The genus name of Poeltidea is in honour of Josef Poelt (1924-1995), who was a German-Austrian botanist (Bryology, Mycology and Lichenology) and was Professor of Systematic Botany at the Free University of Berlin in 1965.

The genus was circumscribed by Hannes Hertel and Josef Hafellner in Nova Hedwigia Beih. vol.79 on page 462 in 1984.

References

External links
Poeltidea at Index Fungorum

Lichen genera
Lecideales genera
Taxa named by Josef Hafellner